Olympia is a 2018 American documentary film directed by Harry Mavromichalis, about the career of Academy Award-winning actress Olympia Dukakis. The film premiered at Doc NYC in 2018 and was released in the United States on July 9, 2020.

Appearances

Release 
Olympia was shown at many film festivals including Doc NYC on November 11, 2018.

 Cleveland International Film Festival
 Thessaloniki International Film Festival
 Martha's Vineyard Film Festival
 RiverRun International Film Festival
 Martha's Vineyard Film Festival

Reception 
Frank Scheck of The Hollywood Reporter calls it "a compelling profile of a woman who's defiantly marched to the beat of her own drum."

Michael Ordoña of Los Angeles Times said Olympia "is much more about the personal than the professional, crafting an interior portrait of a woman at home in her own skin... and certainly an unusual celebrity documentary."

References

External links 
 
 
 

2018 films
American documentary films
2010s English-language films
2010s American films